Paloma Zermeño Rodríguez (born 18 June 1995) is an American-born Mexican footballer and beach soccer player who represents Mexico in international competitions at both sports. She played for the Mexico women's national football team as a forward. She is currently serving as the captain of the Mexican women's national beach soccer team.

International career
Zermeño represented Mexico at the 2014 CONCACAF Women's U-20 Championship. There, she got an ACL injury during the final match against United States. Due to that, she missed the 2014 FIFA U-20 Women's World Cup, and the 2014 season for City College of San Francisco.

She made her senior debut on 16 December 2015, starting in a 3-0 victory against Trinidad and Tobago at the International Women's Football Tournament of Natal of that year. She also appeared at the 2016 Four Nations Tournament and the 2016 CONCACAF Women's Olympic Qualifying Championship. She assisted Katie Johnson in the 6-0 victory against Puerto Rico on 10 February 2016.

References

External links

1995 births
Living people
Citizens of Mexico through descent
Mexican women's footballers
Mexico women's international footballers
Sportspeople from Alameda, California
American sportspeople of Mexican descent
American women's soccer players
Soccer players from California
Women's association football forwards
Beach soccer players
City College of San Francisco alumni
College women's soccer players in the United States